Gordon Goffet (4 March 1941 – 29 July 2004) was an Australian cricketer. He played seventeen first-class matches for New South Wales between 1965/66 and 1968/69.

See also
 List of New South Wales representative cricketers

References

External links
 

1941 births
2004 deaths
Australian cricketers
New South Wales cricketers